Michèle Lamont is a sociologist and is the Robert I. Goldman Professor of European Studies and a Professor of Sociology and African American Studies at Harvard University. She is a contributor to the study of culture, inequality, racism and anti-racism, the sociology of morality, evaluation and higher education, and the study of cultural and social change. She is the recipient of international prizes, such as the Gutenberg Award and  the prestigious Erasmus award, for her "devoted contribution to social science research into the relationship between knowledge, power, and diversity." She has received honorary degrees from five countries. and been elected to several national honorary scientific societies (British Academy, Royal Society of Canada, Chevalier de l’Ordre des Palmes Academiques, Sociological Research Association). She served as president of the American Sociological Association from 2016 to 2017.

Biography
Lamont (born 1957 in Toronto, Ontario, Canada) completed her Bachelor of Arts and Master of Arts degrees in political theory at the University of Ottawa in 1979. She received her Doctor of Philosophy degree in sociology from the French university of La Sorbonne in 1983 and was a postdoctoral fellow at Stanford University from 1983 to 1985. Lamont served as professor at the University of Texas-Austin (1985–1987), Princeton University (1987–2003), and Harvard University (2003–present). She is married to sociologist Frank Dobbin and together they have three children.

Contributions to Socioology
Lamont's major works compare how people's shared concepts of worth influence and sustain a variety of social hierarchies and inequality. She is concerned with the role of various cultural processes in the creation and reproduction of inequality. Recent publications include the Erasmus Prize-winning essay, Prisms of Inequality: Moral Boundaries, Exclusion, and Academic Evaluation; her co-authored book, Getting Respect: Responding to Stigma and Discrimination in the United States, Brazil, and Israel; and her presidential address to the ASA (ASR June 2018). 

Lamont's early writing formulated influential criticisms of the work of Pierre Bourdieu, a leading sociologist with whom she studied in Paris. Her first book, Money, Morals, Manners, showed that Bourdieu's theories of cultural capital and habitus ignore moral status signals and national repertoires that explain differences in American and French class cultures. This criticism set the stage for a large American literature that was critical of, but built upon, the work of Bourdieu. This movement coincided with the development of cultural sociology in American sociology. With fellow sociologists Ann Swidler, Michael Schudson, and numerous others, Lamont contributed to setting the agenda for the scholarly study of "meaning-making" in sociology.  The research of Lamont and colleagues demonstrated the importance of considering various aspects of culture as explanans and explanandum in the social sciences as something more than a "residual category". Since the late nineties, she has been editing the Princeton Studies in Cultural Sociology series with Paul DiMaggio, Robert Wuthnow and Viviana Zelizer at Princeton University Press. This series has published numerous prize-winning monographs over more than twenty years and contributed to the development of the field.

In their widely-cited paper “The Study of Boundaries across the Social Sciences,” Lamont and Molnar demonstrated how boundary work is studied across a wide range of field (identity, professions, knowledge, race, class and more). They also propose the distinction between "symbolic" and "social" boundaries provides a framework within which to analyze the independent causal role of individual's worldviews in explaining structural phenomena such as inequality. Symbolic boundaries are "conceptual distinctions made by social actors... that separate people into groups and generate feelings of similarity and group membership." Conversely, "social boundaries are objectified forms of social differences manifested in unequal access to an unequal distribution of resources… and social opportunities." In making this distinction, Lamont acknowledges that symbolic boundaries are a "necessary but insufficient" condition for social change. "Only when symbolic boundaries are widely agreed upon can they take on a constraining character… and become social boundaries."

Lamont extended her "boundary-work" approach to the case of American and French race relations. In her award-winning Dignity of Working Men, Lamont shows how white and African-American conceptions of class are grounded in vastly different conceptions of self-worth. In Getting Respect, Lamont compares how stigmatized groups respond to ethnoracial exclusion in the United States, Brazil, and Israel.

In her 2009 book, How Professors Think: Inside the Curious World of Academic Judgment, Lamont analyzes how experts in the social sciences and the humanities debate what defines originality, social and intellectual significance, and more. This book also analyzes the place of the self, emotion and interaction in evaluation. It has influenced current debates on funding, evaluation, and audit culture in the United States and Europe.  Of particular interest is the question of whether social sciences should be evaluated with different criteria than the sciences. With this book, Lamont defined a broader program in the sociology of evaluation (including her 2012 paper "Toward a Sociology of Valuation and Evaluation"), which also links to the growing interest in the sociology of valuation. It also sheds light on cultural processes, a topic she took up in a more systematically in an innovative 2014 article titled, “What is Missing? Cultural Processes and Causal Pathways to Inequality.”

An expert in qualitative methods and comparative sociology, Lamont was invited to coedit (with Patricia White) an influential NSF report on “The Evaluation of Systematic Qualitative Research in the Social Sciences” (2008). 

Her new book, Seeing Others: How Recognition Works and How It Can Heal a Divided World, will be published by Simon and Schuster (US) and Penguin (UK) in September 2023. This research was supported by a Carnegie Fellowship, Russell Sage Foundation, and Harvard. This book builds on her British Journal of Sociology paper "From 'having' to 'being': Self-worth and the current crisis of American society."

Career
At UT-Austin, Princeton, and Harvard, Lamont has dedicated her time to research and to educating students. She is a recipient of Harvard’s Everett Mendelson Award for graduate mentorship. She has also occupied several leadership positions in academia:

From 2002 to 2019, Lamont served as co-director of the Successful Societies Program of the Canadian Institute for Advanced Research.  The interdisciplinary program brings together leading social scientists who meet three times a year to discuss how societies met various types of challenges. The group has produced two books: Successful Societies: How Institutions and Culture Affect Health (2009) and Social Resilience in the Neo-Liberal Era (2013). The group also produced a special issue of Daedalus on "Inequality as a Multidimensional Process," which Lamont co-edited with Paul Pierson (2019). The SSP research agenda led to a collaboration with the Robert Wood Johnson Foundation around “the culture of health.” Together with the foundation’s vice president for research, Lamont co-edited a special issue of Social Science and Medicine (2016) on "Mutuality, Mobilization, and Messaging". She also collaborated with a team of ecologists and economists from the Beijer Institute and the Stockholm Resilience Center (Royal Academy of Sweden), on "Our future in the Anthropocene biosphere," which became the White Paper for the 2021 Nobel Summit on sustainability (2021). She was also invited to co-chair the advisory board to the 2022 UN Human Development Report, "Uncertain times, Unsettled Lives: Shaping our Future in a World in Transformation.” 

In 2009 and 2010, Lamont served as Senior Advisor on Faculty Development and Diversity in the Faculty of Arts and Sciences at Harvard University. In this role she put in place a universal mentoring program for tenure-track faculty. And from 2014-2021 Lamont served as acting director and director of the Weatherhead Center for International Affairs (WCFIA). With a large endowment and 235 faculty associates, this center is among the largest social science centers at Harvard. Since 2018, she has been leading the Research Cluster on “Comparative Inequality and Inclusion” at WCFIA.

From 2006-2009, Lamont was the chair of the Council for European Studies and from 2016-2018, she served as president elect, president, and past president of the American Sociological Association. She led the response of the ASA to the Trump Presidency.

Lamont has been a visiting professor at various institutions including the Collège de France, SciencesPo, Université de Paris 8, École des Hautes Études en Sciences Sociales, Mainz University, and Tel Aviv University. She has been a fellow at the Center for Advanced Study in Behavioral Studies at Stanford University (2002), the Radcliffe Institute for Advanced Studies (2006), and the Russell Sage Foundation in 1996, and again from 2019-2020. She was also the recipient of the John Simon Guggenheim Memorial Foundation Fellowship and the Andrew Carnegie Fellowship (2019-21).

She currently serves on various scientific boards including: American Council of Learned Societies (ACLS), The Graduate Institute of International and Development Studies (IHEID), Max Planck Institute for the Study of Religious and Ethnic Diversity, Princeton Institute for International and Regional Studies (PIIRS) and Nordic Centre for Research on Gender Equality in Research and Innovation (NORDICORE).

Selected awards and honors
 Honorary Doctorate, University of Warwick (2022)
 TEDWomen Speaker (2021)
 Top Ten Breakthroughs in Social Sciences and Humanities Award, Falling Walls Foundation (2021)
 Honorary Doctorate, University of Warwick (2020)
Honorary Doctorate, University of Uppsala (2020)
Andrew Carnegie Fellow, Carnegie Corporation of New York (2019)
Elected Corresponding Fellow, The British Academy (2019)
Erasmus Prize (2017)
Honorary Doctorate, University of Ottawa (2017)
Honorary Doctorate, Université de Bordeaux (2017)
Honorary Doctorate, University of Amsterdam (2017)
108th President, American Sociological Association (President-elect: 2015–16; Past-president, 2017–2018)
Elected Member, Royal Society of Canada (2015)
Chevalier de l’Ordre des Palmes Académiques, Gouvernement Français (2014)
Gutenberg Research Award, Johannes Gutenberg University (2014)

Selected bibliography
 Lamont, Michèle (Forthcoming, 2023). Seeing Others: How Recognition Works and How It Can Heal a Divided World. New York: One Signal, Simon and Schuster; London: Penguin.

References

External links
Michèle Lamont’s homepage at Harvard University
The Successful Societies Program (Canadian Institute for Advanced Research).
Culture of poverty and Social Resilience : An interview with Michele Lamont (Books & Ideas, 2011-05-20)
Michèle Lamont: A Portrait of a Capacious Sociologist (Interviewed by Nasar Meer, SAGE, 2016-10-04)
The world is not a field – An interview with Michèle Lamont (Interviewed by Anders Hylmö, Sociologisk Forskning, 2019-06-26)

1957 births
Living people
American sociologists
American women sociologists
University of Paris alumni
Harvard University faculty
Princeton University faculty
Ottawa University alumni
Scientists from Toronto
21st-century American women